Gandesa is the capital of the comarca of Terra Alta, in the province of Tarragona, Catalonia, Spain.

History
In the place known as Coll del Moro there is an ancient Iberian archaeological site belonging to the Ilercavones tribe that lived in this area before Roman times.

Gandesa has a church with unusual and interesting sculptures on the Romanesque porch.

The old winery of Gandesa, also known in Catalonia as one of the Wine Cathedrals, is from Modernisme and Noucentisme style and was designed by the architect Cèsar Martinell in 1919.

Gandesa was at the center of fighting during the Battle of the Ebro in the Spanish Civil War. In the Summer of 1938 Republican forces crossed the Ebro in an attempt to throw back the Nationalist armies of General Franco. This is mentioned in the ballad "Jamie Foyers" and Si me quieres escribir, also known as El Frente de Gandesa. Now there is a museum devoted to the Battle of the Ebro in Gandesa.

On December 23, 1948, an Iberia Airlines Douglas DC-3 crashed in bad weather near Gandesa killing all 27 occupants.

References

External links

Gandesa official site
 Government data pages 

Municipalities in Terra Alta (comarca)
Populated places in Terra Alta (comarca)